The Unknown God or Agnostos Theos is a theory by Eduard Norden first published in 1913 that proposes, based on the Christian Apostle Paul's Areopagus speech in Acts 17:23, that in addition to the twelve main gods and the innumerable lesser deities, ancient Greeks worshipped a deity they called "Agnostos Theos"; that is: "Unknown God", which Norden called "Un-Greek". In Athens, there was a temple specifically dedicated to that god and very often Athenians would swear "in the name of the Unknown God". Apollodorus, Philostratus and Pausanias wrote about the Unknown God as well.

Paul at Athens 

According to the book of Acts, contained in the Christian New Testament, when the Apostle Paul visited Athens, he saw an altar with an inscription dedicated to that god (possibly connected to the Cylonian affair), and, when invited to speak to the Athenian elite at the Areopagus, gave the following speech:

Because the Jewish God could not be named, it is possible that Paul's Athenian listeners would have considered his God to be "the unknown god par excellence". His listeners may also have understood the introduction of a new god by allusions to Aeschylus' The Eumenides; the irony would have been that just as the Eumenides were not new gods at all but the Furies in a new form, so was the Christian God not a new god but rather the god the Greeks already worshipped as the Unknown God. His audience would also have recognized the quotes in verse 28 as coming from Epimenides and Aratus, respectively.

Archaeology

There is an altar dedicated to the Unknown God found in 1820 on the Palatine Hill of Rome.
It contains an inscription in Latin that says:

This could be translated into English as: "Whether sacred to god or to goddess, Gaius Sextius Calvinus, son of Gaius, praetor, restored this on a vote of the senate."

The altar is currently exhibited in the Palatine Museum.

See also

 
 
 Dii involuti

References

External links

 Translated by Max Mueller

1913 introductions
Theories
Greek deities
Names of God
New Testament words and phrases
Christianity in Roman Athens
Christianity and Hellenistic religion
Deities of classical antiquity
Christian terminology
Paul the Apostle
Acts of the Apostles
Conceptions of God